Pingshui Street is a metro station on Line 5 of the Hangzhou Metro in China. It is located in the Gongshu District of Hangzhou.

References

Railway stations in Zhejiang
Railway stations in China opened in 2019
Hangzhou Metro stations